José João de Jesus (born 17 December 1979), commonly known as Chicão, is a Brazilian former footballer.

Club career
Chicão played for a number of clubs in Brazil, most notably for Botafogo-SP in the 1999 and 2001 Brasileirao, as well as the 2001 Campeonato Paulista final.

Arrests
Chicão was first arrested in 2002 on charges of accessory to murder, and was handed a 16-year sentence. He was released from prison in 2010, having served eight years.

He was arrested again in 2011 for threatening people in public with a firearm.

Personal life
Chicão is the father of current Watford player João Pedro.

Career statistics

Club

Notes

References

1979 births
Living people
Brazilian footballers
Association football midfielders
Campeonato Brasileiro Série A players
Associação Desportiva Confiança players
Esporte Clube XV de Novembro (Piracicaba) players
Guarani FC players
Associação Atlética Flamengo players
Botafogo Futebol Clube (SP) players
Associação Atlética Internacional (Limeira) players
Sportspeople from Sergipe